This is a list of airports in Israel, Jerusalem and the Golan Heights sorted by types of airport.

Airports

International airports 

Currently there are three international airports operational in Israel, all managed by the Israel Airports Authority. Ben Gurion Airport serves as the main entrance and exit airport in and out of Israel. Ramon Airport being the second largest airport serves as the primary diversion airport for Ben Gurion Airport, while Haifa Airport also has a military base alongside its civilian terminal.

Unscheduled domestic airports 

There are two other airports managed by the Israel Airports Authority, but have no scheduled flights.

Private airstrips 

There are about 14 other airstrips across Israel and the Golan Heights, which are mostly used privately or for flight trainings.

Military airbases 

All military airbases are owned by the Israeli Air Force.

Spaceport 

Israel's only spaceport, also has a military airbase alongside the spaceport. Traffic is restricted by the Israeli Air Force. It is also managed partially by the Israel Space Agency.

Closed airports

By passenger numbers

Gallery

See also 
 Transportation in Israel
 List of airports by ICAO code: L#LL – Israel
 Wikipedia: Airline destination lists: Asia#Israel

References 

 Israeli Airports Authority (I.A.A.)
 Official map of military airbases
 
  - includes IATA codes
 Great Circle Mapper: Airports in Israel - IATA and ICAO codes
 World Aero Data: Israel - ICAO codes

 
Israel
Airports
Airports
Israel